Giannis Vardinogiannis (born 7 April 1962) is a Greek billionaire shipping magnate, the eldest son of petroleum tycoon Vardis Vardinogiannis. He is included in the Lloyd's List Most influential people in the shipping industry.

Early life and career
Vardinogiannis is of Cretan descent. After graduating from the Athens College preparatory school, he majored in economics at Vassar College in the United States. He is a former car rally champion who owns the private rally team Cyclon Rally Sport, with seven participations (from 1986 to 1992) in the international Acropolis Rally. He was the first Greek driver in Acropolis Rally for five years from 1988 to 1992. He won the Greek Rally title six times (1987 to 1992), driving Lancia Delta with co-driver Kostas Stefanis. Since his retirement from the sport, in 1993, he works in the family business (Vardinogiannis group of companies), which has diverse sectors such as energy, oil refineries, shipping, television broadcasting, publishing and banking. The Vardinogiannis family owns the multi-billion oil refining company Motor Oil Hellas, where he is a member of the board of directors as the executive vice chairman, and also serves shipping company Avin International S.A., and Piraeus Bank. In May 1996, he was married to Mellissa Gromel and now has three sons.

He is the principal shareholder of the Cairo-based Vegas Oil and Gas.

As owner of Panathinaikos F.C.
In the summer of 2000, the President of Panathinaikos, Yiorgos Vardinogiannis resigned from his duties and sold his share to his nephew Giannis Vardinogiannis, who succeeded him and changed the style of management into the club (while continuing to work for various family companies). In 2005, he was a founding member of the Greek Super League and was elected president in 2007, being credited in his efforts to achieve European league standards in Greece. On 22 April 2008, main shareholder Vardinogiannis gave a press conference in which he announced the decision of his family to reduce their share in the club to 50% – after 30 years of full ownership – through an €80 million increase of the company's capital stock. After the negotiations and the share capital increase, the Vardinogiannis family would hold 56% of the club, Panathinaikos Athlitikos Omilos 10% and the rest shareholders 34%. The Vardinogiannis family finally withdrew from Panathinaikos in 2012.

The team had the following successes as an owner of Panathinaikos:
 Quarter-finals in Champions League: 2001–02
 Quarter-finals in Uefa Cup: 2002–03
 Greek Championship: 2004, 2010
 Greek Cup: 2004, 2010

Political views
In February 2015, Vardinogiannis said in a statement to Reuters that the new Prime Minister of Greece Alexis Tsipras had a valid point in attacking corrupt Greek oligarchs.

References

Living people
1962 births
Greek businesspeople
Greek football chairmen and investors
Greek rally drivers
Vassar College alumni
Greek male sport shooters
Panathinaikos A.O.
Panathinaikos F.C.
People in the petroleum industry
People named in the Paradise Papers
Businesspeople from Heraklion